Eryngium maritimum, the sea holly or sea eryngo, or sea eryngium, is a perennial species of flowering plant in the family Apiaceae and native to most European coastlines. It resembles a plume thistle in appearance on account of its burr-shaped flower. Despite its common name, it is not related to true holly, but is an umbellifer.

Etymology
E. maritimum was formally described by Linnaeus in his Species Plantarum I: 233 (1753). The generic name Eryngium derives from Greek and may have developed from a description of the plant by Theophrastus (300 BC), who referred to it as “Eryngion”, meaning a spiny plant. Alternatively, the name may have derived from the Greek word “eruggarein”, meaning to eructate (belch), since the plant was used to treat various disorders such as trapped gases.

The specific epithet maritimum means “of the sea”.

The common English name appears to date from the 16th century. In his 1548 publication The Names of Herbes, the naturalist  William Turner stated that “Eryngium is named in englishe sea Hulver or sea Holly”.

Taxonomy
Although hybrids of E. maritimum have been reported, they are relatively few. For example, records have been made of a hybrid between E. maritimum and  E. campestre (=Eryngium 9 rocheri Corb. ex Guétrot) in France, and in the region of Valencia, Spain.

The species’ chromosome number is 2n = 16

Description

Sea holly is a glabrous, intensely glaucous, clump-forming perennial growing to around 60 cm tall. It is also a slightly succulent xerophyte with a deep well-developed root system and waxy leaf cuticles. The leaves are stiff, spiny, and leathery. The basal leaves, which measure 5 – 15 cm long and are rolled when young, are palmately 3-lobed and suborbicular, truncate, or cordate at the base.  The stem leaves are similar, but are smaller, sessile, and palmate. All leaves have thick cartilaginous margins, with often purplish veins and stomata on both sides. The  petiole is channeled and dilated at the base.

The cotyledons are abruptly contracted into a petiole.

The flowers are bluish white and measure 8mm across, in 1.5 – 2.5 cm heads The bracts are spiny, and the bracteoles are longer than the flowers. The sepals measure 4 – 5 mm and are longer than the petals.

The fruit is 13 – 15 mm, more or less uncompressed and covered in stigmatic papillae which become longer towards the apex. The styles are about 6 mm long, divergent to somewhat recurved.

It flowers June to September.

Identification

Apart from its specific coastal habitat, sea holly may also be distinguished from its congeners by the deeper, strongly spiny teeth on the basal leaves and stem leaves.

Distribution

Throughout its range, sea holly is a coastal species, occurring locally and almost continuously along the coastlines of England and Ireland. In Great Britain, it is most abundant on the south and west coasts, but now largely extinct from the coasts of northeast England and Scotland on a local scale; however, it may have once been more common and widespread here  It was formerly extant in Shetland, but never properly established here at the northernmost limit of its native range. The last Shetland record was made from Fitful Head in 1884, where the plant probably once grew extensively on the sands of the Bay of Quendale 

In Europe and adjacent parts of northern Africa and the Middle East, the plant has a wide native distribution. In these regions, it occurs on the shores of the Atlantic Ocean, the  Baltic and  Mediterranean Seas as well as the  Black and  Azov Seas. The distribution also extends northwards into Denmark, Germany, Poland, Lithuania, Lativa, and Estonia, along the Skagerrak and the Swedish islands of Gotland and Öland. The Scandinavian distribution is relatively southerly, extending only as far north as southern Norway and Sweden 

Sea holly has been introduced to parts of eastern North America, where it was once valued as an ornamental plant for seashore restoration. It has also been introduced to Australia with plantings of marram grass.

Habitat and Ecology

Sea holly characteristically grows on the well-drained substrates of sand dunes and shingles confined to regions with mild winters. More rarely, it may be found growing on rocky coasts featuring patches of sand between artificial hard coastal protection features with a similar structure to shingle.  In northern Britain, its distribution is limited by the lack of suitable dune systems to grow on It withstands the harsh environmental conditions typical of beaches and coastal dune habitats worldwide; namely low soil nutrient levels, frost, strong salty winds, high temperatures and insolation, and periodic sand burial. 

Sea holly is associated with various shingle and strandline communities, where it may be scattered within the vegetation. On shingles, sea holly occurs within Honckenya peploides-Cakile maritima strandline community above the tidal limit  On dunes, sea holly may be found growing in the Elymus farctus ssp. boreali-atlanticus foredune community, the pioneer vegetation on foredunes, with Elytrigia juncea (E. farctus) as a dominant species.

Sea holly is a poor competitor that generally thrives in open areas, declining when habitats are invaded by shrubby species such as Rosa rugosa, Hippophae rhamnoides, Elaeagnus commutata and Salix repens due to substantial shading effects This is because sea holly is a light-demanding plant, although it is protected against water stress through excessive insolation thanks to its succulent equifacial leaves.

Sea holly has deep, well-developed taproots for water storage, allowing the plant to survive long dry periods that may occur in its habitat. The root system also shows a high degree of plasticity in response to the dynamics of coastal ecosystems and may consequently develop a rhizome-like structure. For example, in response to permanent sand burial, the root internodes gradually lengthen in such a way that the perennating buds are brought closer to the ground surface for ensuring the plants' survival throughout the growing seasons.

Status

Despite a widespread native European distribution, populations of this species have been declining substantially in the northern parts of its range, with some of these already having become extinct. It is now threatened or endangered in most European countries and included in endangered plant lists and Red Data Books of several of these countries In Britain, its historic decline may be at least partly attributable to being dug up from the wild on account of its popularity as an ornamental plant in gardens on dry soils.

In culture, use and relationship with humans

Like other species in the genus, E. maritimum has been traditionally consumed to combat various ailments, especially thanks to the plant’s high antioxidant activity and content of phenolic and flavonoid compounds. It has been utilised for its diuretic, stimulant, cystotonic, stone inhibitor, aphrodisiac, expectorant and anthelmintic properties Moreover, essential oils, extracted by hydro-distillation, from the aerial parts of the plant have been found to contain oxygenated sesquiterpenes with antimicrobial activity against E. coli and  L. monocytogenes.

The roots of E. maritimum were formerly candied as a sweetmeat and recommended by Dioscorides as a remedy for flatulence. The young shoots may also be eaten like asparagus.

Sea holly has often been represented in paintings and other artwork, such as in works by Irish artist Patrick O’Hara and on postage stamp prints such as the 1967 one-franc stamp in Belgium, and the 25-pfennig stamp in Germany The plant has also been mentioned in various plays and poems, most notably in the Merry Wives of Windsor by Shakespeare and in the Italian Journey by Goethe.

They are named in a speech by Falstaff: 

Sea holly was nominated the 2002 County flower for the city of Liverpool. Asteroid 199194 Calcatreppola was named after this plant. The official  was published by the Minor Planet Center on 25 September 2018.

Gallery

References

External links
 
 Plants for a Future—PFAF Plant Database: Eryngium maritimum (Sea Holly)
 Schutzstation-wattenmeer.de: Further information and images—  
 Linnaeus.nrm.se; Den virtuelle floran: Distribution map

maritimum
Flora of Europe
Flora of Lebanon
Flora of Ukraine
Medicinal plants of Europe
Plants described in 1753
Taxa named by Carl Linnaeus